Valdenir Barretos (born 6 February 1986 in Rio Brilhante), commonly known as Val Barreto, is a former Brazilian forward.

Honours

Remo
Campeonato Paraense: 2014, 2015

Imperatriz
Campeonato Maranhense: 2019

External links 
 
 
 Val Barreto at ZeroZero 

Living people
1986 births
Brazilian footballers
Association football forwards
Mogi Mirim Esporte Clube players
Clube do Remo players